Ye Myint Swe is a Burmese politician who currently serves as a Amyotha Hluttaw MP for Tanintharyi Region.

Political career
He is a member of the National League for Democracy. In 2015 Myanmar general election , he was elected as a Tanintharyi Region Hluttaw MP, and elected representative from Taninthayi Region No.2 parliamentary constituency. After then , at 2020 Myanmar general election, he was elected as a Amyotha Hluttaw MP and elected representative from Taninthayi Region parliamentary constituency.

References

Living people
People from Tanintharyi Region
1981 births
National League for Democracy politicians